Dr. Dolittle 3 is a 2006 American fantasy comedy film and the third film in the Dr. Dolittle series. It stars Kyla Pratt, the original daughter in the remake series, as Maya. Starring alongside Pratt are Kristen Wilson as Lisa Dolittle and Norm Macdonald as the voice of Lucky the Dog. 

This is the first film not to feature Eddie Murphy as Doctor Dolittle, or Raven-Symoné as Charisse Dolittle, although they are mentioned in the film. It was revealed in a 2023 interview that the reason they did not return was because of Murphy's discomfort playing the father of a grown adult daughter.

Plot
Maya (Kyla Pratt) has evolved considerably from the first film. Though she was formerly an antisocial individual who was more interested in her science projects, Maya has transformed into the typical teenager. Like her sister Charisse, she inherits their father John's capacity for communicating with animals (she is a part-time veterinary assistant), her life has changed drastically on all fronts. She often ends up in trouble with her parents, while her friends think she has gone insane.

With John away on business, Maya's mother Lisa (Kristen Wilson) sends her and her dog Lucky (voice of Norm MacDonald) to a dude ranch named "Durango", so she can find herself. The ranch is owned by Jud (John Amos), and his son Bo (Walker Howard). While at the ranch, Maya, who desperately tried to keep it under wraps so as not to arouse suspicion, uses her talent to "talk to the animals" in order to save Durango from being taken over by a neighboring dude ranch.

Maya is at first reluctant to reveal her ability to others, fearing rejection from her friends, but eventually does so. With her help, the Durango ranch enters a rodeo competition with a $50,000 award, and wins it. Also, she shares her first kiss with Bo and finally wins his heart.

Cast
 Kyla Pratt as Maya Dolittle
 Kristen Wilson as Lisa Dolittle
 Walker Howard as Bo Jones
 John Amos as Jud Jones
 Luciana Carro as Brooklyn Webster
 Tommy Snider as Clayton Taylor
 Calum Worthy as Tyler
 John Novak as Walter
 Chelan Simmons as Vivica 
 Ecstasia Sanders as Tammy
 James Kirk as Peter
 Gary Jones as Principal
 Carly McKillip as Tammy's Friend
 Emily Tennant as Party Kid
 Alistair Abell as Honkey Tonk Announcer
 Peter Kelamis as Rodeo Announcer
 Louis Chirillo as Bus Driver

Voice cast
 Norm Macdonald as Lucky
 Danny Bonaduce as Ranch Steer
 Gary Busey as Butch
 Ryan McDonell as Skip
 Tara Wilson as Kiki
 Chenier Hundal as Chip
 Paulo Costanzo as Cogburn the Rooster
 Chris Edgerly as Diamond the Horse, LP the Horse, Pig, Rattlesnake
 Eli Gabay as Rodeo Bull, Rodeo Steer
 Vanessa Marshall as Tan Hen, White Hen
 Mark Moseley as Harry the Hawk, Patches the Horse, Ranch Steer, Rodeo Longhorns, Silver the Horse
 Jenna von Oÿ as Gracie

Releases
This film was released direct-to-video in 2006; on April 25 for Region 1 and May 1 for Region 2.

Dr. Dolittle 3 was released on Disney Plus on January 15, 2021.

Reception

Critical response
Although a relative success in DVD sales, the film was not well received by critics.

Of the three reviews given at Rotten Tomatoes, two were very negative: one critic, Scott Weinberg, said: "Cheap-looking, atrociously written, and delivered with all the energy of a breach-birth bovine, Dr. Dolittle 3 is all kinds of terrible". David Cornelius of eFilmCritic.com described the film as "not so much poorly made as it is lazy and cheap". Emily Ashby of Common Sense Media was positive to the film.

References

External links
 
 

2006 films
2000s fantasy comedy films
American fantasy comedy films
Direct-to-video sequel films
2010s English-language films
Doctor Dolittle films
Film spin-offs
20th Century Fox direct-to-video films
Davis Entertainment films
Films scored by Christopher Lennertz
Films produced by John Davis
2006 directorial debut films
American children's fantasy films
American children's comedy films
2000s English-language films
2000s American films